Mount Mutis (id: Gunung Mutis), also known as Nuaf Nefomasi, is a mountain and highest point of East Nusa Tenggara, Indonesia, at  above sea level. The mountain is a popular climbing site.

The Dayuan people believe that the Almighty, who gives rain, wing, and life, resides on Mount Mutis.  Amongst local groups living in the area near Mt Mutis there is some concern that the development of local resources by mining and timber companies is doing environmental damage in the region.  The area around Mt Mutis is an Indonesian national park of approximately 12,000 ha in size. Environmental management is a major concern for the managers of the park.

References

External links 
 Climbing Mt. Mutis

Mountains of East Nusa Tenggara
Mount Mutis